Jingdezhen is a prefecture-level city, in northeastern Jiangxi province, with a total population of 1,669,057 (2018), bordering Anhui to the north. It is known as the "Porcelain Capital" because it has been producing Chinese ceramics for at least 1,000 years, and for much of that period Jingdezhen porcelain was the most important and finest quality in China.  The city has a well-documented history that stretches back over 2,000 years.

History 
Throughout both the Spring and Autumn Period and the Warring States Period, the area of present-day Jingdezhen belonged to the Chu State. Under the Han Dynasty, the particular area of future Jingdezhen was known as Xinping. Historical records show that it was during this time that it began to make porcelain.

The town was established during the Jin Dynasty under the name Changnan, due to its location on the south bank of the Chang river. The town's name would be changed twice, first in 742 CE to Fuliang, and then in 1004 to Jingdezhen, its current name, after the era name of the Emperor Zhenzong of Song during whose reign its porcelain production first rose to fame. The town was placed under the jurisdiction of Fuliang County.

In the Ming and Qing dynasties, Jingdezhen was considered one of China's four great towns in terms of commercial and industrial importance. The others were Foshan in Guangdong, Hankou in Hubei, and Zhuxian in Henan.

In 1855 during the Taiping Rebellion, Taiping forces destroyed all 9,000 kilns in Jingdezhen. They would be rebuilt after the war in 1866.

In the 19th century, Jingdezhen became a county.

On April 29, 1949, Communist forces took the city.

May 4, 1949, it was upgraded to a prefecture city. However, to honor its history, Jingdezhen retained it the word zhen meaning town in its name. Usually when a town is upgraded to a city, the designation of shi meaning city replaces that of zhen.

On June, 1953 Jindezhen was upgraded into a provincial level city.

In 1960, Fuliang County was merged into the city.

Jingdezhen was named one of top 24 national historical and cultural cities of the People's Republic of China on February 28, 1982.

In July 1983, Leping County was also merged into the city. In October 1988, Fuliang County was re-established, and in September 1992, Leping County was re-established as a county-level city.

In 2004, Jingdezhen celebrated the millennium of its becoming the porcelain capital and it is assuming its present name.

Due to the relatively low cost of living and the heritage of the porcelain industry, Jingdezhen has become a haven for young artists from all over China, who are often referred to known as Jingpiao (景漂).

Geography 

Jingdezhen is situated in the north-east of Jiangxi and borders on Anhui; the city center area is located in the north-east of the Poyang Lake Plain.

There are some cities and counties between Jiangxi and Anhui Province around Jingdezhen. To its north, northwest and northeast are Dongzhi, Xiuning and Qimen County of Anhui province. To its south are Wannian County and Yiyang County. To its west is Boyang County. Lastly, to its southeast are Wuyuan County and Dexing City.

Jingdezhen's natural resources include kaolin, coal, manganese, and lime, but it is the kaolin that has made the city famous in China and the world. For over a millennium, its unique kaolin has enabled Jingdezhen to make high-quality porcelain. (The word "Kaolin" came from "Gaoling" or "Kaoling", a village located in Ehu Town, Fuliang County, Jingdezhen).

Climate
Jingdezhen has a humid subtropical climate (Köppen Cfa) affected by the East Asian monsoon, with long, humid, very hot summers and cool and drier winters with occasional cold snaps. With monthly percent possible sunshine ranging from 25% in March to 56% in August, the city receives 1,798 hours of bright sunshine annually. Summer is the sunniest season here, while autumn remains warm to mild and relatively dry. Extreme maximum temperatures of above  have been recorded, as have extreme minimums below .

Administrative divisions 
The city of Jingdezhen is divided into 4 county-level divisions: Zhushan District, Changjiang District, Fuliang County, and the county-level city of Leping. These 4 county-level divisions administer 52 township-level divisions, and 687 village-level divisions.

Porcelain

Jingdezhen may have produced pottery as early as the sixth century CE, though it is named after the reign name of Emperor Zhenzong, in whose reign it became a major kiln site, around 1004. By the 14th century it had become the largest centre of production of Chinese porcelain, which it has remained, increasing its dominance in subsequent centuries.  For several centuries, almost all top quality Chinese porcelain has come from the town.  From the Ming period onwards, official kilns in Jingdezhen were controlled by the emperor, making "imperial porcelain" in large quantity for the court and the emperor to give as gifts.

Although apparently an unpromising location for potteries, being a remote town in a hilly region, Jingdezhen is close to the best quality deposits of petuntse, or porcelain stone, in China, as well as being surrounded by forests, mostly of pine, providing wood for the kilns. It also has a river leading to river systems flowing north and south, facilitating transport of fragile wares.  The imperial kilns were in the centre of the city at Zhushan (Pearl Hill), with many other kilns four kilometres away at Hutian.

It has produced a great variety of pottery and porcelain, for the Chinese market and as Chinese export porcelain, but its best-known high quality porcelain wares have been successively Qingbai ware in the Song and Yuan dynasties, blue and white porcelain from the 1330s, and the "famille rose" and other "famille" colours under the Qing dynasty.  The town continues to produce cheaper tablewares in great quantity, as well as more expensive decorative pieces.  During the Cultural Revolution, Jingdezhen produced a large number of porcelain Mao badges and statues of a seated Mao Zedong.

Jingdezhen porcelain has fetched record prices at auctions, with a blue and white porcelain jar produced during the Yuan dynasty auctioning for $27.7 million in London in 2005, and a porcelain cup produced during the Ming dynasty auctioning for $36.3 million in 2014.

Economy
Jingdezhen serves as an important industrial and commercial base in Jiangxi Province. In 2018, Jingdezhen achieved a GDP of 92.611 billion yuan. Of this, 6.62% of the city's GDP came from its primary sector, 44.22% came from its secondary sector, and the remaining 49.16% came from its tertiary sector.

As of 2018, the per capita disposable income of urban residents in the city is ¥37,183, which ranks third among prefecture-level divisions in Jiangxi (behind Nanchang and Xinyu). Per capita disposable income for rural residents for 2018 is ¥16,510, which ranks fourth among prefecture-level divisions in Jiangxi (behind Pingxiang, Xinyu, and Nanchang).

For 2018, the city's public budget revenue was ¥8.98555 billion, and its public budget expenditure was ¥20.43550 billion.

Industry 

There are some important industrial enterprises in Jingdezhen City, such as Changhe Aircraft Industries Corporation; Jingdezhen Ceramics; Jingdezhen Refrigeration Compressor, etc.

Changhe Aircraft Industries Corporation, a subsidiary of the Aviation Industry Corporation of China, is based in Jingdezhen. The firm, established in 1969, mainly sells helicopters to the People's Liberation Army, but also does business with firms such as Boeing, Sikorsky, and Leonardo. Changhe produces aircraft parts for the Boeing 767-300BCF.

Jiangxi Changhe Automobile Co Ltd, commonly known as Changhe, is an automotive firm owned by BAIC Group which is based in the city. The firm is forecast to produce 53,400 vehicles in 2019.

Jingdezhen Ceramics Co Ltd is a joint venture with a French company and is most famous of Jingdezhen's ceramic companies. In February 2002, then-CCP General Secretary Jiang Zemin presented a porcelain set produced by the company under its Hongye brand to U.S. President George W. Bush.

Jingdezhen Refrigeration Compressor Company is well known in China for its non-Eph refrigeration compressor. It holds a 20% share of its market in China.

Agriculture

Jingdezhen is a major agricultural center in Jiangxi, with extensive rice cultivation within its boundaries. The area is also an important producer of commodity grain, pigs, and cotton.

In Fuliang County there are some large-scale tea plantations and processing facilities. The tea of Fuliang County is well known in China. Bai Juyi, a famous poet of Tang Dynasty China, wrote a poem that says "My merchant loved money more than family, he left me to go to Fuliang to buy tea last month". This suggests that one thousand years ago Fuliang was already well known for its tea. In 1915, Fuliang's "Fuhong" brand tea won a golden prize in Panama–Pacific International Exposition.

Leping City, the "Vegetable Township of South China", is a major vegetable growing and processing area for Jiangxi Province even for China. Its vegetable output and sales are important to the agricultural economy of Jiangxi Province. In 2007, Leping had 1.7 million hectares under cultivation that produced a total output of 620,000 tons. The Agriculture Ministry of China also designated Leping as a demonstration zone for "pollution-free" vegetable production.

Transportation
Jingdezhen is the most important transportation hub in the northeast region of Jiangxi province. Historically, Jingdezhen's main communication route was via the Chang River. It could ship its porcelain down the Chang to Poyang Lake and connected there with the Yangtze River in Hukou County, Jiangxi Province. From there the porcelain could get to the coast for export. Today, the city is connected to the rest of China via road, rail, and air.

Road
G35, running from Jinan, Shandong to Guangzhou, Guangdong,
G56 Hangzhou-Ruili Highway from Hangzhou, Zhejiang to Ruili, Yunnan,
G206, running from Yantai, Shandong to Shantou, Guangdong.

Rail
The Anhui–Jiangxi Railway connects Jingdezhen to many key cities in China such as Shanghai, Nanjing, Jinan, Qingdao, Hefei, Guangzhou, Fuzhou, Xiamen, Nanchang, Kunming and Guiyang, etc. In addition, the Jiujiang- Jingdezhen-Quzhou Railway is under construction. In the near future, the two rail lines will intersect in Jingdezhen, and make the city an important rail transportation hub in Jiangxi Province and East China. The Jingdezhen Railway Station is located in the city center and is under the control of the Nanchang Railway Bureau.

Air

CAAC statistics show that in 2008 Jingdezhen Airport served 189,256 passengers, 81st among all Chinese airports. Annual cargo and mail traffic was 119.8 tons; annual landings were 2,424,  ranking 111st and 91st respectively in China.

There are flights from Jingdezhen to Beijing(CA), Shanghai(ZH), Guangzhou(ZH), Shenzhen(ZH), Chengdu(CA), Hangzhou(MU), Fuzhou(ZH), Kunming(MU), Xiamen(CA), Xi'an(ZH). There are no international flights. Jingdezhen Airport is the second largest airport in Jiangxi Province. The largest is at Nanchang.

Local transit
In that time, the city had no taxi service and the buses were channel-type bus, it could carry more than one hundred passengers at most at the same time. This kinds of buses were renewed when they were operated to the end of 1990s.

Currently, Jingdezhen public buses and taxis are the two main means of transportation within the city. Nearly more than 20 public bus lines crisscross the city and its countryside. Taxis in Jingdezhen are plentiful; fares start at ¥8 for the first .

Education
Jingdezhen has 4 higher education institutions, 110 secondary schools, 328 primary schools, and 4 special education schools.

The city's 4 higher education institutions are the Jingdezhen Ceramic Institute (JCI), Jiangxi Ceramic Arts and Crafts Vocational and Technical College, and Jingdezhen Ceramic Vocational and Technical College.

Among the city's secondary schools is the No.1 Middle School of Jingdezhen, which was founded in 1940. It is famous for its success rate, relative to other schools in Jiangxi Province, in placing its students in Chinese colleges.

Public health
Jingdezhen has more than 20 medical service institutions with a total 2182 beds. Doctors and nurses number 2,672. It has the largest hospital system in the north-east of Jiangxi Province. The No.1, No.2 and No.3 People's Hospital of Jingdezhen are the most important hospitals in the city; the No.4 People's Hospital is a psychiatric hospital.

Tourism

Travel Overview

Jingdezhen is a major tourism destination within Jiangxi Province, receiving 85.063 million tourists in 2018. Jingdezhen also has 8 4A tourist attractions, and 14 3A tourist attractions. The city also provides access to nearby popular tourist areas such as Lushan, Huangshan, and Wuyuan.

At present, Jingdezhen has the most tourist hotels of any city in Jiangxi Province. In the city there is one quasi-five-star hotel, two four-star hotels, and many three-star and other common grade hotels.

Twin towns – sister cities
 : Arita, Saga, Japan
 : Seto, Aichi, Japan
 : Icheon, Gyeonggi-do, South Korea
 : Redbridge, London, UK
 : Delft, South Holland, Netherlands
 : Door County, Wisconsin, US

Domestic
 Chaoyang District, Beijing
 Dongcheng District, Beijing
 Shenzhen, Guangdong

References
 Curtis, Julia B., Stephen Little & Mary Ann Rogers, Trade taste and transformation, Jingdezhen porcelain for Japan, 1620–1645, New York, China Institute Gallery, 2006.

External links
 Official site of the Jingdezhen Government  (Languages: English, Chinese)

Footnotes

References
Krahl, Regina, "Jingdezhen" Grove Art Online, Oxford Art Online. Oxford University Press. Web. 2 Nov. 2016. subscription required
Rawson, Jessica, Chinese Ornament: The Lotus and the Dragon, 1984, British Museum Publications, 
Vainker, S.J., Chinese Pottery and Porcelain, 1991, British Museum Press, 

Cities in Jiangxi
Prefecture-level divisions of Jiangxi